The Afghanistan cricket team toured Sri Lanka in November 2022 to play three One Day International (ODI) matches. These matches formed part of the inaugural 2020–2023 ICC Cricket World Cup Super League. All three matches were played at the Pallekele International Cricket Stadium. Sri Lanka recovered from losing the first match, and the second encounter ending with no result due to rain, to level the series in the third game.

Squads

Before the start of the series, Bhanuka Rajapaksa withdrew from the Sri Lanka squad, stating that he wished to take a break from the 50-over format. Pramod Madushan was also ruled out of Sri Lanka's squad due to injury; Nuwanidu Fernando and Milan Rathnayake respectively were named as replacements.

ODI series

1st ODI

2nd ODI

3rd ODI

Statistics

Most runs

Most wickets

Sri Lankan cricket team in India in 2022-23

References

External links
 Series home at ESPNcricinfo

International cricket competitions in 2022–23
2022 in Sri Lankan cricket
2022 in Afghan cricket
International cricket tours of Sri Lanka
Afghan cricket tours abroad